"The Lying Detective" is the second episode of the fourth series of the British television series Sherlock and the twelfth episode overall. The episode was first broadcast on BBC One, BBC First, PBS and Channel One on 8 January 2017.

Plot

Sherlock remains distant to Watson, who is still grieving over the death of his wife, Mary ("The Six Thatchers"). John, who is seeing a new therapist, conceals the fact that he is having hallucinations of Mary. Culverton Smith, a prominent entrepreneur and philanthropist, gathers close colleagues, including his daughter, Faith, to confess that he is going to kill somebody. Before he does so, he forcibly injects them with a serum that inhibits memory causing them to forget his confession. Despite that, Faith is able to remember fragments and writes them down on a sheet of paper. She comes to Sherlock, who has started abusing drugs again, with the sheet of paper saying that there was a name  one word  that shook her. Sherlock dismisses her case as being too weird and refers her to Scotland Yard. Before she leaves, Sherlock realises that Faith is suicidal, and offers to walk with her around London. Mycroft tracks Sherlock's movement across the city, and calls John out of concern, accidentally implying existence of another Holmes sibling. Sherlock and Faith walk all night, and the following morning he decides to take her case. Sherlock is momentarily overwhelmed by the side effects of his drug use and, upon gathering himself, finds Faith gone. As Sherlock stumbles back to his flat, he realises that the 'one name' was "anyone". Smith is a serial killer with the wealth and power to hide his crimes completely.

Sherlock becomes obsessed with Smith, but his drug-addled antics frighten Mrs. Hudson, who subdues him. Mrs. Hudson takes Sherlock to see John while he is at his therapist's house for a session. Sherlock accuses Smith of being a serial killer and asks John to help bring him down. Much to John's shock and annoyance, the arrival of a car sent by Smith, and of Molly Hooper with an ambulance to his therapist's house at the exact time, were all prearranged by Sherlock two weeks prior, even before John had chosen his new therapist.

Sherlock and John arrive at a studio to meet with Smith, during which it's revealed Smith has used Sherlock's accusation as a publicity stunt to support his new brand of cereal, making him a "Cereal Killer" and claiming Sherlock was in on the joke, after which the latter takes them to visit a new hospital wing for which he had been a major donor. He subtly hints to Sherlock and John at being a serial killer while meeting with a group of children at the hospital. Smith takes Sherlock and John to his 'favourite room', the mortuary, whilst repeatedly referring to the American serial killer H. H. Holmes. John asks Smith how he moves through all of the rooms freely, to which Smith replies that he has keys to the hospital. Sherlock tries to goad Smith into a confession just as Faith arrives, having been texted by Sherlock from Smith's phone. Upon seeing her, Sherlock realises that she was not the woman who had come to his flat. Frustrated and suffering from withdrawal, Sherlock attacks Smith with a scalpel, but is stopped by John. John attacks Sherlock out of anger, and blames him for Mary's death.

Sherlock is admitted into Smith's hospital, where John pays him one last visit. Sherlock is then visited by Smith, who enters the room through a secret door. Sherlock asks Smith to kill him, and Smith complies after confessing to his murders. Unknown to him, the events were part of Sherlock's elaborate plot to expose Smith and fulfill Mary's last wish for Sherlock to "save John" by "going to Hell". Acting on Mary's orders, Sherlock puts himself in harm's way so that John would be compelled to rescue him, thus mending their broken friendship and "saving" himself. After seeing Mary's video for himself, John rushes to the hospital and arrives in time to pull Smith off Sherlock. Believing that he would be able to get away without proof of his confession, Smith is surprised when Sherlock reveals a recording device hidden in John's walking stick which John had left behind earlier. John reconciles with Sherlock, telling him that he no longer blames him for Mary's death. He also confesses to Sherlock that he had cheated on her by texting with another woman. Sherlock comforts him as he weeps, and John's hallucinations of Mary finally disappear.

Later having pulled himself back together and resumed taking cases, Sherlock discovers the note "Faith" had left him, proving the woman was real. Upon inspecting the note under a black light Sherlock finds the message "Miss me?". During John's next session, his therapist reveals she was the one who had pretended to be both Faith, having gained the letter from Smith, whom she knew through a "Mutual Friend", and the woman with whom John had been texting. Holding John at gunpoint, she reveals herself to be Eurus, Sherlock and Mycroft's secret sibling (she explains that Eurus is Greek for the east wind). As John attempts to leave, Eurus pulls the trigger.

Production

The episode was based loosely on the Doyle short story "The Adventure of the Dying Detective". The villain, Culverton Smith, was loosely based on disgraced British entertainer and charity fundraiser Jimmy Savile, who was a BBC icon. Sam Wolfson of The Guardian noted that the Savile-esque character must have caused consternation behind the scenes at the BBC. Wolfson gave "a respectful nod to the BBC," writing, "There must have been some unease in the corporation about having an episode in their flagship drama series in which a beloved public figure... uses his position of power and fame to commit monstrous crimes."

Broadcast and reception
The episode received positive reviews from critics. Kaite Welsh of IndieWire graded "The Lying Detective" an A+, particularly the plotline of Sherlock descending into drug addiction: "He really does turn his kitchen into a meth lab, he is weeks away from death and hallucinating. It's the flip side of the genius that carries the show."

Vox rated the episode 3.5/5 stars. Sean O'Grady  of The Independent gave the episode 4/5 stars, describing it as "Rarely can drama have come so morbidly loaded as last night's Sherlock, and rarely carry so much morbid fascination for the viewer". IGN gave the episode a good rating with a 7/10, describing it as "hampered by another unsatisfying case and some odd story beats".

Allison Shoemaker of The A.V. Club praised the episode and the story, grading it a B+, writing, "'The Lying Detective' does what it does so dazzlingly well that it's easy to overlook its misses... It's got a couple of good twists, some familiar to readers of the stories and others not. It's affecting and funny and moving and smart, and in short, a great script. But just because something checks all the right boxes doesn't mean it totally works, and Steven Moffat's script falls a bit flat where it really counts. It's as if he's blinded to the big picture by his own considerable gifts. This is a great Sherlock/Watson story with time to spare for everything but them."

References

External links
 

2017 British television episodes
Television episodes written by Steven Moffat
Sherlock (TV series) episodes